Vivek Rajgopal is an Indian actor who works predominately in Tamil-language films.

Personal life 
Vivek Rajgopal's mother tongue is Malayalam, but he settled in Tamil Nadu.

Career 
Vivek Rajgopal had an interest for acting and subsequently joined Koothu-P-Pattarai and trained under Guru Somasundaram. After playing supporting roles in Naanga and Mathapoo, he debuted in the lead role in Oru Modhal Oru Kadhal (2014) before getting his breakthrough with Echcharikkai (2018). He received the role after Ashok Selvan, who was supposed to do the role recommended Vivek's name. He was chosen to play a role in the web series Queen after the makers liked his performance in Echcharikkai.

Filmography 
All films are in Tamil, unless otherwise noted.

References

External links 

Living people
Indian male film actors
Tamil male actors
Male actors from Tamil Nadu
21st-century Indian male actors
Male actors in Tamil cinema
Year of birth missing (living people)